Louise Frances Field (née Story, 1856–1940) was an Irish novelist and literary critic who wrote an early historical study of children's literature in England.

Life and work
Born Louise Frances Story in 1856 to a Justice of the Peace in Bingfield, Crossdoney, Co. Cavan, Field wrote under the name Mrs Field or Mrs E. M. Field, and is occasionally listed as Louisa. She wrote stories for and about children and was known for her writings on the Sepoy Indian Rebellion of 1857 and the Irish Famine.

Works

References

Further reading
Uncle Jack's Story By Mrs. E. M. Field

1856 births
1940 deaths
20th-century Irish novelists
Irish women novelists
20th-century Irish women writers